The seventh season of Will & Grace premiered on September 16, 2004 and concluded on May 19, 2005. It consisted of 24 episodes.

Cast and characters

Main cast 
 Eric McCormack as Will Truman
 Debra Messing as Grace Adler
 Megan Mullally as Karen Walker
 Sean Hayes as Jack McFarland
 Shelley Morrison as Rosario Salazar

Recurring cast 
 Harry Connick Jr. as Dr. Marvin "Leo" Markus
 Bobby Cannavale as Vince D'Angelo
 Tim Bagley as Larry
 Jerry Levine as Joe
 Leslie Jordan as Beverley Leslie
 Leigh-Allyn Baker as Ellen

Special guest stars 
 Jennifer Lopez as herself
 Janet Jackson as herself
 Will Arnett as Artemus Johnson
 Molly Shannon as Val Bassett
 Kristin Davis as Nadine
 Victor Garber as Peter Bovington
 Rip Taylor as himself
 Jamie-Lynn Sigler as Ro
 Blythe Danner as Marilyn Truman
 Jeff Goldblum as Scott Woolley
 Lily Tomlin as Margot
 Patti LuPone as herself
 Edward Burns as Nick
 Chita Rivera as Lenore
 Michele Lee as Lucille
 Luke Perry as Aaron
 Stuart Townsend as Edward
 Sharon Stone as Dr. Georgia Keller
 Debbie Reynolds as Bobbi Adler
 Alan Arkin as Martin Adler
 Stacy Keach as Wendell Schacter
 Alec Baldwin as Malcolm Widmark
 Seth Green as Randall Finn
 Eric Stoltz as Tom Cassidy

Guest stars 
 Mark Harelik as Tim
 Stephen Tobolowsky as Ned Weathers
 Sam Pancake as Jimmy
 Erinn Hayes as Katherine Fallon
 Larry Poindexter as Dan Fallon
 Roscoe Lee Browne as Linus
 Patrick Fabian as Alan
 John Ducey as Jamie
 Lee Garlington as Annette
 Robert Costanzo as Paul D'Angelo
 Josh Keaton as Salvatore
 Hallee Hirsh as Olivia Walker
 Buck Henry as Leonard
 Eric Allan Kramer as Barry
 Phil Morris as Dr. Norman
 Lee Majors as Burt Wolfe
 Emily Rutherfurd as Joanne
 Bridget Flanery Viv Cassidy

Episodes

References

7
2004 American television seasons
2005 American television seasons
Television episodes directed by James Burrows